The State Venereological Institute in Moscow was founded by Russian venereologist Volf Bronner in 1922. He became its first director.

References 

1922 establishments in Russia
Medical research institutes in the Soviet Union